Arutla Ramchandra Reddy was an Indian freedom fighter. He represented Bhongir constituency from 1962 to 1967. He was among the leaders and fighters in the armed freedom struggle against the rule of Nizam (the last ruler of the erstwhile princely state of Hyderabad). The communists joined with the poor peasants in the present day Telangana state   during the 1940s to overthrow  the Nizam's feudal regime. It was a sub-movement in the larger independence struggle of India, his wife Arutla Kamala Devi  was involved in Freedom Struggle and she too was a Member of Legislative Assembly for 3 terms .

Early life
Arutla Ramchandra Reddy was born in Kolanpak in Alair mandal of Nalgonda district.

Career
Arutla Ramachandra Reddy participated in  the armed struggle against the tyrannical regime of the Nizam, during which time he underwent rigorous imprisonment and led underground life.

Personal life
Arutla Ramchandra Reddy was married to Arutla Kamaladevi.

References

Telangana Rebellion
Telugu people
People from Nalgonda district
Andhra Pradesh MLAs 1962–1967
Communist Party of India politicians from Telangana